Eduardo de Castro González (born 3 March 1957) is a Spanish public servant and politician who currently serves as the Mayor-President of the autonomous city of Melilla. Since 2015 he has been a member of the Assembly of Melilla.

Biography
De Castro was born in Melilla in 1957. He studied labor relations at the University of Granada. From a young age, he worked as a public servant for the Ministry of the Interior and the Government of Melilla, including coordination and management jobs.

In 2015, De Castro became involved in politics, and he was designated candidate of the political party Citizens for Mayor-President of Melilla. In the 2015 Melilla Assembly election, Citizens obtained 2 out of 25 seats.

In the 2019 Melilla Assembly election, De Castro repeated as candidate of Citizens for Mayor-President. Citizens obtained 1 out of 25 seats, De Castro's own seat. At the investiture vote held on 15 June 2019, De Castro put forward his candidature for Mayor-President. With the support of the Coalition for Melilla (8 seats) and the Spanish Socialist Workers' Party (4 seats), he earned the vote of an absolute majority of members (13 out of 25 members) and was elected as Mayor-President, ending the nineteen-year tenure of his predecessor Juan José Imbroda.

In April 2021, de Castro was expelled from Citizens due to an ongoing investigation for alleged perversion of justice vis-à-vis irregularities with the crane service concession in Melilla.

References

1957 births
Mayor-Presidents of Melilla
Members of the Assembly of Melilla
People from Melilla
Citizens (Spanish political party) politicians
Living people